Axel Clerget (born 28 February 1987) is a French judoka. He is the 2017 European silver medalist in the 90 kg division.

References

External links

 
 
 

People from Saint-Dizier
1987 births
French male judoka
Living people
Sportspeople from Haute-Marne
Mediterranean Games bronze medalists for France
Mediterranean Games medalists in judo
Competitors at the 2013 Mediterranean Games
Judoka at the 2019 European Games
European Games medalists in judo
European Games bronze medalists for France
Judoka at the 2020 Summer Olympics
Medalists at the 2020 Summer Olympics
Olympic medalists in judo
Olympic gold medalists for France
Olympic judoka of France
21st-century French people